State Route 204 (SR 204) is a primary state highway in the U.S. state of Virginia. Known as Popes Creek Road, the state highway runs  from SR 3 near Potomac Mills east to George Washington Birthplace National Monument in northwestern Westmoreland County.

SR 204 is a Virginia Byway.

Route description

SR 204 begins at an intersection with SR 3 (Kings Highway) just north of Potomac Mills, the former site of a mill on Popes Creek. The state highway heads straight east-northeast through a forested area with intermittent farmland. As SR 204 approaches George Washington Birthplace National Monument, the state highway passes between fields and is flanked by rows of trees. The state highway reaches its eastern terminus at the entrance to the national monument, just east of which is a four-leg roundabout that contains in its center a replica of the Washington Monument.

History
SR 204 was designated in July 1933. The section from SR 3 to the George Washington Birthplace was a renumbering of State Route 610, and a second section from US 360 north to Oak Row was a renumbering of State Route 609. In May 1938, the southern section extended north to SR 623. In April 1949, this southern section was cancelled (it is now SR 624).

Major intersections

References

External links

Virginia Highways Project: VA 204

204
State Route 204
204